The Pretoria Convention was the peace treaty that ended the First Boer War (16 December 1880 to 23 March 1881) between the Transvaal Boers and Great Britain. The treaty was signed in Pretoria on 3 August 1881, but was subject to ratification by the Volksraad within 3 months from the date of signature. The Volksraad first raised objections to a number of the clauses of the treaty, but did eventually ratify the version signed in Pretoria, after Britain refused any further concessions or changes to the treaty.

British preparation work for the Pretoria Convention of 1881 was done at Newcastle, KwaZulu-Natal.

Under this agreement, the South African Republic regained self-government under nominal British suzerainty.

This convention was superseded in 1884 by the London Convention.

Background

By the time of the Battle of Majuba, the governments of the South African Republic and Britain were in contact, President Brand of the Orange Free State acting as intermediary.

See also
 Treaty of Vereeniging

References

External links

Treaties of the United Kingdom (1801–1922)
History of South Africa
History of Pretoria
1881 in South Africa
First Boer War
1881 treaties
Treaties of the South African Republic
South Africa–United Kingdom relations
Peace treaties of the United Kingdom